The Hollywood Music in Media Award for Best Original Song in an Independent Film is one of the awards given annually to people working in the motion picture industry by the Hollywood Music in Media Awards (HMMA). It is presented to the songwriters who have composed the best "original" song, written specifically for an independent film. The award was first given in 2017, during the eighth annual awards.

Winners and nominees

2010s

2020s

References

American music awards